Kentucky's 1st congressional district is a congressional district in the U.S. state of Kentucky. Located in Western Kentucky, and stretching into Central Kentucky, the district takes in Henderson, Hopkinsville, Madisonville, Paducah, Murray, and Frankfort. The district is represented by Republican James Comer who won a special election to fill the seat of Rep. Ed Whitfield who resigned in September 2016.  Comer also won election to the regular term to begin January 3, 2017.

Characteristics

Until January 1, 2006, Kentucky did not track party affiliation for registered voters who were neither Democratic nor Republican. The Kentucky voter registration card does not explicitly list anything other than Democratic Party, Republican Party, or Other, with the "Other" option having a blank line and no instructions on how to register as something else.

Kentucky counties within the 1st Congressional District: Adair, Allen, Ballard, Boyle, Caldwell, Calloway, Carlisle, Casey, Christian, Clinton, Crittenden, Cumberland, Franklin, Fulton, Graves, Henderson, Hickman, Hopkins, Livingston, Lyon, Marshall, Marion, McCracken, Metcalfe, Monroe, Ohio, Russell, Simpson, Taylor, Todd, Trigg, Union, Washington, and Webster. Portions of Anderson and Logan counties are within the district.

Recent presidential elections

List of members representing the district

Recent election results

2000

2002

2004

2006

2008

2010

2012

2014

2016

2018

2020

2022

See also

Kentucky's congressional districts
List of United States congressional districts

Notes

References

 Congressional Biographical Directory of the United States 1774–present

01
Constituencies established in 1792
1792 establishments in Kentucky
Constituencies disestablished in 1933
1933 disestablishments in Kentucky
Constituencies established in 1935
1935 establishments in Kentucky